"My Mistakes" is a song by UK grime artist Wiley, featuring guest vocals from Manga and Little Dee. It was released as the second single from his third studio album, Playtime Is Over, on 6 April 2007.

Music video 
Wiley is in front of a tower rapping. There are two big screens and you can see Wiley rapping. Wiley is on a PSP rapping. There are his gang friends with him at the end.

Track listings
Digital download 
 "My Mistakes" - 2:49

Credits and personnel 
 Lead vocals – Wiley, Little Dee, Manga
 Producer – Bless Beats
 Lyrics – Richard Cowie, Little Dee, Manga
 Label: Big Dada

Release history

References 

2007 singles
Wiley (musician) songs
Songs written by Wiley (musician)
2007 songs